Wang Yuanyuan (born November 16, 1977) is a male Chinese freestyle wrestler who competed at the 2004 Summer Olympics.

He finished sixth in the 96 kg freestyle competition.

External links
 

1977 births
Living people
Chinese male sport wrestlers
Olympic wrestlers of China
Wrestlers at the 2004 Summer Olympics
Wrestlers at the 2002 Asian Games
Wrestlers at the 2006 Asian Games
Asian Games competitors for China
20th-century Chinese people
21st-century Chinese people